Rhodoprasina koerferi is a species of moth of the  family Sphingidae. It is known from Bhutan.

References

Rhodoprasina
Moths described in 2010